Volcanic Bird Enemy and the Voiced Concern is the third studio album by American musician Travis Miller, under the stage name Lil Ugly Mane. It was self-released via Bandcamp, along with cassette releases on October 12, 2021.

After its release, Volcanic Bird Enemy and the Voiced Concern gathered positive reviews from Sputnik Music and Stereogum.

Track listing
 All tracks are written and produced by Lil Ugly Mane. 

 Notes
 All tracks are stylized in all caps on Bandcamp, and lowercase elsewhere. For example, "Bird Enemy Car" is stylized as either "BIRD ENEMY CAR" or "bird enemy car".
 "Cursor" contains an extended outro exclusive to music services outside of Bandcamp, totaling the track at 4:18, and the album at 59:57.

Personnel
Credits are adapted from Bandcamp.

 Lil Ugly Mane – vocals
 Shawn Kemp – production, instrumentation
 Kora Puckett of Narrow Head – lead guitar on "Headboard"
 Patrick Quinn – cover art

References

2021 albums
Travis Miller (musician) albums